No Turning Back is the debut studio album by Irish rockabilly musician Imelda May. Originally, the album was released in 2003 under the name Imelda Clabby. However, it was later remixed and reissued in 2007.

Track listing

References

2003 debut albums
Imelda May albums